The Kosciuszko Wild Horse Heritage Act 2018, also known as the Brumby Bill, is a state-based act of parliament in New South Wales (NSW). Its long title is An Act to recognise the heritage value of sustainable wild horse populations within parts of Kosciuszko National Park and to protect that heritage. The Act was assented on 15 June 2018 and commenced with immediate effect.

The purpose of the Act is to recognise the heritage value of sustainable wild horse populations within parts of Kosciuszko National Park and to protect that heritage. This includes the creation of a 'Wild horse heritage management plan' and a Wild Horse Community Advisory Panel to ensure that a permanent population of wild horses is maintained within Kosciuszko National Park.

The Act has been the subject of considerable controversy, having been criticised by media, scientific groups, academics, advocacy groups, and politicians due to allegations that it prioritises an invasive animal over the wellbeing of native species in the Kosciuszko National Park.

In October 2021, whilst announcing his resignation from politics, John Barilaro stated that "the iconic Snowy Mountains Brumby was saved when I legislated the Kosciusko Wild Horses Heritage Bill 2018".

Reactions and critiques
Opponents of the Kosciuszko Wild Horse Heritage Act alleged that John Barilaro, who tabled the Bill, had a conflict of interest, as he had previously received political donations from former-Nationals MP for Monaro Peter Cochran. Mr Cochran, who runs a company that provides horseback tours to see Brumbies in Kosciuszko National Park, has previously claimed to have helped write the Bill, however has denied having a vested commercial interest in the Brumby Bill being enacted.

The International Union for Conservation of Nature criticised the Bill after it was passed by the Legislative Assembly, stating that prioritising the historical value of feral animals over native species "creates a disturbing precedent at both national and global levels". The IUCN also expressed concern with the proposed make-up of the Wild Horse Community Advisory Panel, noting that "the panel does not require the inclusion of any scientific or policy experts on nature conservation". These concerns have also been echoed by the Australian Academy of Science, which described the Wild Horse Heritage Act as "incompatible with the principles that underpin Australia’s world-leading protected area system, and with our commitments as a signatory to the Convention on Biological Diversity".

The day after the Bill was passed into law, Professor David Watson, a member of the NSW Threatened Species Scientific Committee, resigned from the group, citing the Brumby Bill's "wilful disregard" for science. Academics from Deakin University have also criticised the Bill, describing it as a "backward step for environmental protection in Australia".

Advocacy groups have provided differing responses to the Kosciuszko Wild Horse Heritage Act. The Invasive Species Council stated that by passing the Brumby Bill, that "the NSW Government turned Australia into a global laughing stock". The Bill has also been criticised by the Ecological Society of Australia, which described it as "a dangerously reckless policy that will escalate environmental impacts, increase costs of feral horse management, and put horses at risk of extreme suffering". In contrast, the Australian Brumby Alliance has praised the Brumby Bill as striking a balance "to the benefit of both the Brumbies and the Environment", and described negative responses to the Bill as "hysteria".

In response to the passing of the Brumby Bill, the Invasive Species Council, National Parks Association of the ACT, National Parks Association of NSW, Colong Foundation for Wilderness, and the Nature Conservation Council of NSW founded Reclaim Kosci, a group which aims "to protect the exceptional natural heritage values of Kosciuszko National Park from the damaging impacts of feral horses".

Prior to the 2019 New South Wales state election, Labor, the Greens and the Shooters, Fishers and Farmers Party had pledged to repeal the Kosciuszko Wild Horse Heritage Act. In 2019, Labor MP Penny Sharpe introduced a bill to the NSW Legislative Council to repeal the Act, which was never brought to a vote due to a lack of support.

Petitions calling for repeal
In 2019, Reclaim Kosci delivered to NSW parliament a petition with over 12,000 signatures, which called for the repeal of the Brumby Bill. The petition was voted down by Liberal-National MPs in the Legislative Assembly despite the tradition of allowing petitions from all constituents to be tabled and noted.

In 2021, Reclaim Kosci brought another petition to NSW parliament, calling for the repeal of the Kosciuszko Wild Horses Heritage Act, which gained 15,228 signatures. The petition was tabled by indepentent MP Joe McGirr, and noted by then-Minister for Energy and Environment Matt Kean on 18 March 2021.

See also
Invasive species in Australia

References

New South Wales legislation
Environmental law in Australia
2010s in Australia
2018 establishments in Australia